Ernest Henry Chambers (7 April 1907 – 29 January 1985) was an English track cyclist who won a silver medal at the 1928 Summer Olympics and the 1932 Summer Olympics. He also competed at the 1936 Summer Olympics.

He was born in the London borough of Hackney, and was the brother of Stanley Chambers. The two brothers rode together to win the silver medal in the tandem sprint event.

For some years Ernie Chambers owned a cycle shop in London Road Mitcham near Figges Marsh, adjacent to the Gardeners Arms public house.

Palmarès

1928
2nd 1928 Summer Olympics - Tandem 2000 metres, with John Sibbit

1932
2nd 1932 Summer Olympics - Tandem 2000 metres, with Stanley Chambers

References

1907 births
1985 deaths
English male cyclists
Olympic cyclists of Great Britain
Cyclists at the 1928 Summer Olympics
Cyclists at the 1932 Summer Olympics
Cyclists at the 1936 Summer Olympics
Olympic silver medallists for Great Britain
People from Hackney Central
Olympic medalists in cycling
Medalists at the 1928 Summer Olympics
Medalists at the 1932 Summer Olympics